The third season of The Block NZ premiered on 26 August 2014 and ended on 18 November 2014. It ran four nights per week, Tuesday–Friday.

The season was set in the Auckland suburb of Point Chevalier, and was judged by Home and Garden editor Shelley Ferguson and architect Mark Gascoigne.

Contestants

Kiwibank Block Out Live
The season was the first to feature the Kiwibank Block Out Live online game, a bingo-style game designed to be played by viewers watching the show live. It consists of a grid of nine squares, each containing an event or quote from the show. When the event is broadcast, viewers have a few minutes to tap the corresponding square. The first person to unlock all nine squares on a given night wins a $100 gift card.

Controversy
In mid-March, Eyeworks, the company that produces The Block NZ, sent letters to households in the area surrounding the future site of the show in Point Chevalier to say that filming would start in late May or early June. Around 20 members of the neighbourhood met to try and prevent the show from being produced there because of safety, traffic, light, and noise concerns. When Eyeworks decided to continue, residents took the production company to court. Although the show was not relocated, restrictions—such as a noise curfew after  and on weekends, and the crew only being able to park in set areas—were put in place.

Episodes

Results

Winners and losers

Peer reviews

At the start of the following week, each couple walks through the other couple's room from the previous week and score them out of 10. The couple that receives the highest total score wins $1000 to go towards their budget.

In week 8, $4000 was awarded.

Challenges

Dinner Wars

Week 12
Throughout the first three episodes of week 12, teams competed in three challenges. The winner of each challenge earned 3 points, the runner-up earned 2 points, third place earned 1 point, and fourth place earned 0 points. As winners, Maree & James got to decide the order that the houses were auctioned.

Auction results
As the team that earned the most, Alex & Corban won an extra $80,000. Because Quinn & Ben won so little, and with them starting a family, Alex & Corban gifted them $30,000 of their winnings.

References

2014 New Zealand television seasons